Chagar Bazar (Šagir Bazar, Arabic: تل شاغربازار) is a tell, or settlement mound, in northern Al-Hasakah Governorate, Syria. It is a short distance from the major ancient city of Nagar (Tell Brak). The site was occupied from the Halaf period (c. 6100 to 5100 BC) until the middle of the 2nd millennium BC.

Archaeology

The site contains two mounds, a higher but smaller one to the south and a lower larger northern one. Occupation was Halaf at the northern end then at the southern end in the Late Chalcolithic period followed by full occupation in the 3rd millennium BC. The 2nd millennium BC occupation was restricted to the northern (5 hectare) mound. Chagar Bazar was excavated for three seasons by the British archaeologist Max Mallowan, with his wife Agatha Christie, from 1935 to 1937. Many of the artefacts discovered were brought to the British Museum. Besides pottery, a large number of Old Babylonian period clay tablets written in cuneiform script were discovered. Work was resumed at the site in 1999 by an expedition from the British School of Archaeology in Iraq in cooperation with University of Liège archaeologists and the Syrian Directorate-General of Antiquities and Museums. During these excavations, which ended in 2002, 214 cuneiform tablets were recovered.

Chagar Bazar and its environment

Occupation history
Chagar Bazar was already settled in the Neolithic. Excavations revealed pottery belonging to the Halaf and Ubaid cultures.

By the Early Bronze Age, in the third millennium BC, Chagar Bazar had turned into a small town with the size of 12 hectares / 30 acres. The site appears to have been abandoned by the end of the third millennium BC. It was resettled and was known as Asnakkum at the beginning of the Middle Bronze Age. The town was part of the Kingdom of Upper Mesopotamia under Shamshi-Adad I and his son Yasmah-Adad. Hurrians also occupied the city and fine examples of the Khabur ware pottery dating to this period have been discovered by the excavators.

Notes

See also 
Cities of the Ancient Near East
Tell Brak
Hurrians
Come, Tell Me How You Live

References
C. J. Gadd, "Tablets from Chagar Bazar 1936", Iraq, vol. 4, no. 2, pp. 178–185, 1937
C. J. Gadd, "Tablets from Chagar Bazar and Tell Brak 1937–38", Iraq, vol. 7, pp. 22–61, 1940
J. E. Curtis, "Some Axe-Heads from Chagar Bazar and Nimrud", Iraq, vol. 45, no. 1, pp. 73–81, 1983
O. Tunca et al., Chagar Bazar (Syrie) I: Les sondages prehistoriques (1999–2001), Peeters, 2006, 
O. Tunca et al., Chagar Bazar (Syrie) II: Les vestiges post-akkadiens du chantier D et etudes diverses, Peeters, 2007, 
O. Tunca and A. Baghdo, Chagar Bazar (Syrie) III: Les trouvailles epigraphiques et sigillographiques du chantier I (2000–2002), Peeters, 2008, 
Tunca, Ö., Bagdhou, a. und Léon, S., "Chagar Bazar (Syrie) IV. Les tombes ordinaires de l’âge du bronze ancien et moyen des chantiers D-f-H-I (1999−2011)", Étude archéologique, Peeters Publishers, 2018 
J. Mas and O. Tunca, "Chagar Bazar (Syrie) V: Les tombes ordinaires de l'âge du Bronze ancien et moyen des chantiers D-F-H-I (1999-2011): La poterie", (Publications de la ... de L'Universite de), Peeters Publishers, 2018 
S. Leon, "Chagar Bazar (Syrie) VI: Les tombes ordinaires de l'âge du Bronze ancien et moyen des chantiers D-F-H-I (1999-2011): Les objets", (Publications de la ... de L'Universite de), Peeters Publishers, 2018  
R Ali and J-M Cordy, "Chagar Bazar (Syrie) VII: Les tombes ordinaires de l'âge du Bronze ancien et moyen des chantiers D-F-H-I (1999-2011): Les Ossements", (Publications de la ... de L'Universite de), Peeters Publishers, 2018  
Tunca, Ö., Bagdhou, A, "Chagar Bazar (Syrie) VIII. Les tombes ordinaires de l’âge du bronze ancien et moyen des chantiers D-f-H-I (1999−2011): Études diverses", Étude archéologique, Peeters Publishers, 2018

External links
British Museum: Pottery Khabur Ware Jar from Chagar Bazar

Archaeological sites in al-Hasakah Governorate
Stone Age sites in Syria
Hurrian cities
Former populated places in Syria
Halaf culture